Corpse Pond is a small lake in Ontonagon County, Michigan, located at .

See also
List of lakes in Michigan

References

External links
Corpse Pond fishing at fishingworks.com
 Corpse Pond map at eachtown.com
List of Ontonagon County lakes

Lakes of Michigan
Bodies of water of Ontonagon County, Michigan